Sabulilitoribacter arenilitoris is a Gram-negative and non-motile bacteria from the genus of Sabulilitoribacter which has been isolated from sand from the South Sea in Korea.

References 

Flavobacteria
Bacteria described in 2017